Raymond Mearns is a Scottish actor and comedian who is best known for his part in Scottish comedy sitcom Legit, in which he played Happy Boab. He has also appeared in Ae Fond Kiss... and It's a Free World..., which were both directed by award-winning Ken Loach. Mearns has also acted alongside his brother Eddie when they played the Blind Twins, Troy and Roy Pettifer in the 1998 short film Home, which won Best Short Film at the 1999 BAFTA Awards. He appeared in the Rab C. Nesbitt Christmas special, in which he played a BBC security guard. It aired on 23 December 2008. He also starred in Next Time Ned.

Works

TV Shows

Movie

Web series

External links
raymondmearns.com, the official Raymond Mearns website

Scottish stand-up comedians
Living people
Year of birth missing (living people)
Scottish male television actors
Scottish male film actors